On 8 January 1992, about 20:20 JST, while attending a banquet hosted by the Prime Minister of Japan, Kiichi Miyazawa, U.S. President George H. W. Bush fainted after vomiting in Miyazawa's lap. Doctors later attributed the incident to a case of acute gastroenteritis.

History

George H.W. Bush rang in the New Year of 1992 with a 12-day trade-focused trip to Asia and the Pacific to discuss America's post-Cold War readjustment of economic relations and policies. On 8 January 1992, Bush played a doubles tennis match with U.S. ambassador to Japan Michael Armacost against Emperor of Japan Akihito and his son, Crown Prince Naruhito. The emperor and crown prince won.

That evening, Bush attended a state event for 135 diplomats held at the Japanese Prime Minister's residence. In between the second and third courses, Bush, who had been scheduled to give remarks at the dinner, fainted in his chair while vomiting in Miyazawa's lap. First Lady Barbara Bush held a napkin to her husband's mouth until the United States Secret Service took over. While still on the floor, Bush quipped to his personal physician, Burton Lee, "Roll me under the table until the dinner's over." He assured dinner guests he had "influenza" and left for the evening. Barbara Bush later gave a speech in President Bush's place where she affectionately teased Armacost for the tennis game and jokingly claimed defeat was something her family was not used to.

The following day, 9 January, spokesman Marlin Fitzwater said Bush had a common intestinal flu and he was feeling fine. That afternoon, Bush held a news conference with Akihito at the Akasaka Palace.

Aftermath
The incident was widely reported, coming just weeks before the New Hampshire presidential primary and became fodder for the nation's comedians. Footage of the President vomiting was broadcast on the ABC network. The incident was parodied by Saturday Night Live with a mock documentary featuring Barbara Bush trying to escape by crawling across the table. 

Shortly after the incident, an Idaho man named James Edward Smith called CNN and posed as the president's physician, claiming Bush had died. A CNN employee entered the information into a centralized computer used by both CNN and its sister network CNN Headline News, and Headline News nearly aired it before it could be verified. Smith was subsequently questioned by the Secret Service and hospitalized at a private mental health facility for evaluation.

In Japan, Bush continued to be remembered for this event for several years. According to the Encyclopedia of Political Communication, "The incident caused a wave of late-night television jokes and ridicule in the international community, even coining Busshu-suru which literally means 'to do the Bush thing'" (or "Bushing it").

In 1993, the incident was spoofed in the comedy film Hot Shots! Part Deux. According to a 2007 listicle published by USA Today, the incident was one of the top "25 memorable public meltdowns that had us talking and laughing or cringing over the past quarter-century."

In the pilot episode of the animated sitcom television series King of the Hill, lead character Hank Hill recalls the time "George Bush went to Japan and vomited on their auto executives." The animated sitcom The Simpsons mentions the incident in the episode "Two Bad Neighbors" where Bush, during a brawl with Homer Simpson, says "I'll ruin you like a Japanese banquet."

See also
 Jimmy Carter rabbit incident
 Bill Clinton haircut controversy
 Dick Cheney hunting incident
 Bush shoeing incident
 2009 U.S. state dinner security breaches
 Obama tan suit controversy

References

1992 in American politics
1992 in international relations
1992 in Japan
January 1992 events in Asia
Japan–United States relations
Vomiting incident
Bush, George H. W. vomiting incident
George H. W. Bush administration controversies